Poutanen is a surname. Notable people with the surname include:

Elias Poutanen, Australian-born Finnish host/computer-game critic
Kira Poutanen (born 1974), Finnish writer, translator and actress
Reino Poutanen (1928–2007), Finnish rower

See also
Meanings of minor planet names: 3001–4000#760